Good Love may refer to:

 The Good Love, a 1963 Spanish film

Music
 Good Love (Meli'sa Morgan album) or the title song, 1987
 Good Love (EP) or the title song, by The Maine, 2011

Songs
"Good Love" (Klymaxx song)
"Good Love" (Sheek Louch song)
"Good Love", by Aly & AJ from Ten Years
"Good Love", by Anita Baker from Giving You the Best That I Got
"Good Love", by Bat for Lashes from Two Suns
"Good Love", by Bic Runga from Belle
"Good Love", by Isaac Hayes from South Park: Bigger, Longer & Uncut
"Good Love", by Mary J. Blige featuring T.I. from Stronger with Each Tear
"Good Love", by Poison from Open Up and Say...Ahh!
"Good Love", by Prince from Crystal Ball
"Good Love", by TLC from 3D
"Good Love", by City Girls featuring Usher
"Good Lovin'", by The Rascals from The Young Rascals